St Mary, Stoke Newington is a parish church in Stoke Newington, London Borough of Hackney. Designed in the Gothic Revival version of the Decorated style by George Gilbert Scott and completed in 1858, it replaced a medieval and 16th century church, now an arts venue, and serves what remains of the ancient parish of Stoke Newington after other parishes were split from it in 1849, 1873, 1883 and 1892.

The design was loosely based on that of Salisbury Cathedral. It is Grade II* listed. The first vicar was Thomas Jackson, who, as a young rector, was attracting congregations from all over London by his reputation as a preacher. The church's steeple, however, was not completed until 1890, by Scott's son John Oldrid Scott, which led to a humorous rhyme being composed:

A restoration of St Mary's was undertaken under Nugent Cachemaille-Day after the Second World War. It was Grade II* listed on 1 September 1953.

References

Stoke Newington
19th-century Church of England church buildings
Church of England church buildings in the London Borough of Hackney
Churches completed in 1858
Diocese of London
Gothic Revival church buildings in London
Grade II* listed churches in London
George Gilbert Scott buildings